Treorchy Comprehensive School is an English language, comprehensive school in the village of Treorchy, Rhondda Cynon Taf, Wales. The school is situated on the southern side of the valley, and is 500 metres in length from the main gate on Conway Road, Cwmparc, to the rear gate at Tylecoch Bridge, Treorchy.

Pupils who are identified as being proficient in Welsh will study RE, History, PE, PSHE and Geography through the medium of Welsh at KS3. At KS4, first language Welsh is offered at GCSE.

History
Formerly the site of the Tylecoch Colliery, Treorchy Comprehensive School began as the Upper Rhondda School and opened in 1965. In 1970 the school became a fully comprehensive school which could accommodate over 1,800 pupils taught by over 100 teachers. Subjects included English, Maths, General Science, French, Welsh, Geography, History, Physical Education, Art, Woodwork, Music and Religious Knowledge.

The aim of the school is to satisfy the social and academic needs of children in the Upper Rhondda. The curriculum offers opportunities to study subjects in which pupils have a particular interest and aptitude. Pupils are placed in broad ability bands based on assessments from Primary schools they have attended. The school now serves 22 Primary Schools, 8 of which are in the catchment area and 3 of which are first language Welsh schools.

Facilities

The school contains a number of facilities, including I.T. suites spread across the school, sporting facilities, three canteens providing hot and cold foods, a swimming pool and drama and music suites.

Courses
Treorchy Comprehensive follows the basic English S.A.T. and GCSE Curriculum. It offers French and Spanish as modern foreign languages, and Welsh and English as compulsory subjects for all pre-A level students.

Key Stage 3
The average Key Stage 3 pupil studies a maximum of 16 subjects taken from the National Curriculum, including English, Maths, Sciences, a modern foreign language, humanities, compulsory physical education, compulsory religious education, and compulsory Welsh. According to the last Estyn report, in 2006, the school achieves Key Stage 3 results just above the national average.

Courses
At Key Stage 4, students are offered to choose their own courses, which will be cut to 10 different courses, spread across a fortnightly timetable. The subjects from Key Stage 3 are offered at GCSE, GNVQ and BTEC levels. Compulsory P.E. and compulsory R.E. become 'short course' options, while students are offered the chance to study them as a 'full course' equal to a full GCSE. New courses are also offered at this level including Health and Social Studies, Leisure and Tourism, Media and Film Studies and Business and Communications Studies. The school has achieved an A*-G pass rate of over 90% since 2005.

A.S./A-2 A-Level Courses
A-level students are offered a range of courses to choose from. This range expands much more on the previous two key stages, and adds new subjects also. The student may choose a maximum of 5 or a minimum of 2 courses. The school is one of the few in the Rhondda that does not need pupils to travel to other schools to receive an A-level course. In 2007, the school began a compulsory Welsh Baccalaureate qualification for Sixth Form pupils. Other new courses on offer to pupils in the Sixth Form include Politics, Psychology, and Law and Electronics, as well as vocational subjects such as Hairdressing in the school's on site salon.

Extra-curricular activities
The school supports extra-curricular activity offers a wide variety of clubs and activities for pupils. These range from orchestra to rugby. The activities include:

The Arts
The school annually hosts performing arts events. As well as concerts in school, junior productions, the annual "Back To Broadway" performance and the Christmas concert, senior pupils perform a musical annually at the Parc & Dare Theatre. The performances are listed below:
 2020 - Our House
 2019 - The Wedding Singer
 2018 - Anything Goes
 2017 - Fiddler on the Roof
 2016 - Les Misérables
 2015 - Singin' in the Rain
 2014 - West Side Story
 2013 - Miss Saigon
 2012 - Phantom Of The Opera
 2011 - We Will Rock You
 2010 - Guys & Dolls
 2009 - Jekyll & Hyde
 2008 - Les Misérables
 2007 - My Fair Lady
 2006 - Calamity Jane
 2005 - Carousel

The following activities take place daily within the school:
Drama Club
School Junior & Senior Brass Band
School Junior & Senior Choir
School Junior & Senior Orchestra
Various School Shows in the Parc and Dare Theatre

Sports
Rugby
Football
Basketball
Netball
Cricket
Rounders
Athletics
Gymnastics
Circuit training
Badminton
Dance
Hockey
Swimming

Sixth Form Activities
Sign Language
Reading Support
Buddy Program
Sixth Form Council

School-wide
Student Council
Conservation Club
Combined Cadet Force (CCF)

Notable former pupils

Arts
Brad Evans - author and political philosopher 
Callum Scott Howells – actor, singer, and television personality
Rachel Trezise – author 
Ian Watkins – West End Performer, and former member of the pop band Steps
Wes Packer – Stand-up comedian.

Business
 Amanda Blanc – chief executive officer of Aviva

Sport
 Andrew Bishop – Former professional Rugby Union Player for Wales and Ospreys
 David Bishop – Former professional Rugby Union Player for Ospreys, Sale Sharks, Edinburgh and Jersey.
 Gemma Evans – Football player for Wales, Cardiff City Ladies and Yeovil Town
 Ethan Lewis – Rugby Union Player for Cardiff Blues
 Jayne Ludlow – Former professional Football Player for Wales and Arsenal now coach for Wales women.
 Lou Reed – Former professional Rugby Union player for the Scarlets
 Gary Powell – Former professional Rugby Union Player for the Cardiff Blues
 Tomos Williams – Professional Rugby Union Player for Wales and Cardiff Blues

Classes
At KS3 (years 7 and 8 at the school) most pupils are divided into one of several mixed ability classes. There is also one class for pupils with complex additional learning needs. Each class is assigned a colour. Pupils stay in these classes for both years. Pupils regularly complete assessments in all subjects.

At the start of KS4 pupils are separated into one of two bands based on their maths, English and science abilities (determined throughout KS3). The band reflects whether a pupil will study for the Double Award Science GCSE (T band) or the three Triple Science GCSEs (P band). Pupils begin their KS4 studies in year 9 and complete them at the end of year 11.

Pupils begin their KS5 studies in year 12 and complete them at the end of year 13.

References

Secondary schools in Rhondda Cynon Taf
Educational institutions established in 1965
1965 establishments in Wales
Treorchy